Bettis Academy and Junior College is a historic African-American Baptist school complex and national historic district located near Trenton, Edgefield County, South Carolina.  Bettis Academy and Junior College was established in 1881 and closed in 1952.  The complex now consists of three contributing buildings and one contributing site, all dating from the last 20 years of the institution. The remaining buildings are the rock-faced Alexander Bettis Community Library (1939); a bungalow-form building with a dual-pitched pyramidal roof; the stuccoed brick Classroom Building (1935); and the rock-faced Colonial Revival style Biddle Hall (1942).

The library was originally the Iowa City Unit of the Faith Cabin Libraries that was built by the students. It was later named the Alexander Bettis Community Library.

It was listed on the National Register of Historic Places in 1998.

References

African-American history of South Carolina
School buildings on the National Register of Historic Places in South Carolina
Historic districts on the National Register of Historic Places in South Carolina
Colonial Revival architecture in South Carolina
School buildings completed in 1942
Buildings and structures in Edgefield County, South Carolina
National Register of Historic Places in Edgefield County, South Carolina
1935 establishments in South Carolina